In 1996 Yamaha introduced the Royal Star motorcycle. This motorcycle uses the basic power package from the Yamaha Venture Royale.

Other machines using variations of this engine include the Royal Star Venture, the Royal Star Tour Deluxe, and the V-Max.

Vehicle information

Appearance
The Yamaha Royal Star was the first Star Motorcycle Yamaha introduced. It is a traditional cruiser design, styled after the Indian Motorcycles. A little bit of that Indian flavor remains in the later Royal Star Venture, and the Royal Star Tour Deluxe.

Standard and Tour Classic versions were initially made. The Standard model had four mufflers and no windscreen or sidebags, though they were available as accessories. The Tour Classic had four mufflers, a windscreen, and soft or leather covered hard sidebags. In 1997 a Tourdeluxe version was introduced. The Tourdeluxe had two mufflers, a windscreen, and hard sidebags.

The Standard model was a little lighter and the seat was a little lower.

Mechanical

The drive package on the Royal Star includes a liquid-cooled  (referred to as 1,300 cc) V4 engine. It has four valves per cylinder, overhead camshafts, and shim over bucket valves. The five speed overdrive transmission is part of the engine case and both the engine and transmission share oil. The drive shaft and final drive assembly are built into the left side of the double sided swing arm. Swing arm motion is damped by a monoshock mounted horizontally under the center rear of the frame, forward of the rear wheel. The clutch is of the wet plate design and is hydraulically activated by the left hand lever. The brake system uses two disk brakes on the front and one disk on the right rear. All calipers are of four piston design.

engine specifications

Type
    Water-cooled, 4 Stroke 
Displacement
    1294 cm3
Bore X Stroke
    2.99x2.59 in OR 75.9x65.8 mm
Compression Ratio
    - 
Horsepower
    75/4750 KW(hp)/RPM
Torque
    82.5/3500 lb-ft/RPM OR 112/3500 Nm/RPM
Fuel System
    - 

transmission specifications

Gearbox
    5 Speed 
Clutch
    - 
Primary Drive
    - 
Final Drive
    Shaft 

chassis specifications

Frame
    - 
Front Suspension
    - 
Rear Suspension
    - 
Front Brake
    Dual Discs With 4-piston Calipers 
Rear Brake
    Single Disc With 4-piston Calipers

Dimensions

Dimension specifications

Overall Length
2250
    - 
Overall Width
    - 263kg
Seat Height
    28 in OR 711 mm
Wheelbase
    66.7 in OR 1694 mm
Ground Clearance
    - 
Weight
    672.4 lbs OR 305 kg
Fuel Capacity
    4.8 gallons OR 18 L

Tires specifications

Front
    150/80-16 
Rear
    150/90-15

References

Royal Star
Motorcycles introduced in 1996
Cruiser motorcycles
Touring motorcycles